Central Market was a fresh food market in Central, Hong Kong and the first wet market in the city. It is one of only two existing Bauhaus market buildings in Hong Kong, the other one being Wan Chai Market.

After years of disuse, it was reopened to the public on Aug 23, 2021 as a new centre for retailers, eateries and public areas. This was after a major renovation led by the Urban Renewal Authority, which retained some original architectural structures, such as some market stalls and its iconic stairwell.  

It is located between Jubilee Street, Queen Victoria Street, Queen's Road Central and Des Voeux Road Central. By its side is the first public female toilet and first above-ground toilets in Hong Kong.

History

The precursor of the market was Canton Bazaar, which was established in 1842 on Queen's Road Central between Cochrane Street and Graham Street. In 1843, it was also known as the Middle Bazaar. The Chinese population were later forced to relocate from Central to the Tai Ping Shan area due to a series of fires. The market was then replaced by residential houses for Europeans. The bazaar was moved to Queensway, where the present-day High Court stands. It housed Chinese furniture dealers, joiners, cabinet makers and curio shops. Due to its proximity of Naval Yard and the construction of cantonment, the bazaar, shops and civil tenement had to be moved. In the 1850s, it was moved to its current location on Des Voeux Road (then known as The Praya). Its name also changed to Central Market.

The market was rebuilt in 1858, then completely replaced with a Western marble structure in 1895. The rebuilt market was a three-storey Victorian-style structure with a tower in the middle.

The market was demolished again in 1937, this time replaced with a Bauhaus structure. Construction was completed in 1938, and cost HK$900,000. The market re-opened on 1 May 1939.

The Chinese name displayed at the Des Voeux Road Central entrance was not restored until 1993. Central Market was the biggest meat market in Southeast Asia and the then-Governor of Hong Kong David Trench made a visit to the market in 1967. The importance of the market attracted another Governor Alexander Grantham to pay another visit.

In 1994, the western part of its second floor was converted into the Central Escalator Link Alley Shopping Arcade, an access way between the Central Elevated Walkway and Central–Mid-Levels escalators. It was managed by the Urban Council until its dissolution in 1999. The market was then closed in March 2003.

Structure
The market is housed in a 4-storey reinforced concrete structure, and contains 200 booths inside. The market is spacious with a central court, high ceiling and window walls for natural light and ventilation. There are two entrances of the market. The Des Voeux Road Central entrance is on the ground floor while the Queen's Road Central entrance bridges the first floor. In the early days, the root floor were offices and quarters of hygiene inspectors and other staff.

Current status
The building was largely abandoned from 2003, with few stores along a renovated pedestrian corridor inside, Central Escalator Link Alley Shopping Arcade. The corridor linked by two footbridges to Hang Seng Bank Headquarters Building and Central Elevated Walkway, and another footbridge to the Central–Mid-Levels escalator. Shops in the arcade included tailors, cleanser, collectors and other trades. On Sunday, one side of the corridor is a popular gathering place among Filipino domestic workers.

Prior to the redevelopment, the building was temporarily redecorated on the theme of Central Oasis.

From 2017 to 2021, the building underwent significant works for preservation and revitalization, including major rehabilitation to the ageing building structure. This was being overseen by the Urban Renewals Authority. The pedestrian corridor continued to provide access through the site during the majority of the redevelopment works.

The Central Market reopened to the public in August 2021, operated by the Chinachem Group on a ten-year lease. Works are still ongoing, including the façade facing Des Voeux Road Central.

Conservation
Central Market is listed as a Grade III historic building. It is part of the Central and Western Heritage Trail.

References

External links

A Study on Historical and Architectural Context of Central Market. The Hong Kong Institute of Architects. July 2005
 Antiquities Advisory Board. Historic Building Appraisal. Central Market No. 80 Des Voeux Road, Central Pictures
 
 
 
 

Central, Hong Kong
Retail markets in Hong Kong
Grade III historic buildings in Hong Kong
British colonial architecture
Streamline Moderne architecture
1842 establishments in Hong Kong